Kana Extended-B is a Unicode block containing kana originally created by Japanese linguists to write Taiwanese Hokkien known as Taiwanese kana.

Block

History
The following Unicode-related documents record the purpose and process of defining specific characters in the Kana Extended-A block:

See also 
 Kana Supplement (Unicode block)
 Small Kana Extension (Unicode block)
 Hiragana (Unicode block)
 Katakana (Unicode block)
 Kana Extended-A (Unicode block)

References 

Unicode blocks